The Chinese Professional Baseball League recognizes hit champions in each season; the champions have been awarded from 1994.

Champions

External links

Chinese Professional Baseball League lists
Chinese Professional Baseball League awards